In mathematics, a prime number p is called a Chen prime if p + 2 is either a prime or a product of two primes (also called a semiprime). The even number 2p + 2 therefore satisfies Chen's theorem.

The Chen primes are named after Chen Jingrun, who proved in 1966 that there are infinitely many such primes. This result would also follow from the truth of the twin prime conjecture as the lower member of a pair of twin primes is by definition a Chen prime.

The first few Chen primes are
2, 3, 5, 7, 11, 13, 17, 19, 23, 29, 31, 37, 41, 47, 53, 59, 67, 71, 83, 89, 101, … .

The first few Chen primes that are not the lower member of a pair of twin primes are

2, 7, 13, 19, 23, 31, 37, 47, 53, 67, 83, 89, 109, 113, 127, ...  .

The first few non-Chen primes are

43, 61, 73, 79, 97, 103, 151, 163, 173, 193, 223, 229, 241, … .

All of the supersingular primes are Chen primes.

Rudolf Ondrejka discovered the following 3 × 3 magic square of nine Chen primes:

, the largest known Chen prime is 2996863034895 × 21290000 − 1, with 388342 decimal digits. 

The sum of the reciprocals of Chen primes converges.

Further results
Chen also proved the following generalization: For any even integer h, there exist infinitely many primes p such that  p + h is either a prime or a semiprime.

Green and Tao showed that the Chen primes contain infinitely many arithmetic progressions of length 3. Binbin Zhou generalized this result by showing that the Chen primes contain arbitrarily long arithmetic progressions.

Notes
1.Chen primes were first described by Yuan, W. On the Representation of Large Even Integers as a Sum of a Product of at Most 3 Primes and a Product of at Most 4 Primes, Scienca Sinica 16, 157-176, 1973.

References

External links
 The Prime Pages
 
 
 

Classes of prime numbers